Patrick H. Horgan III (born August 22, 1960) is an American professional golfer who played on the PGA Tour and the Nationwide Tour.

Horgan was born in Newport, Rhode Island. He attended the University of Rhode Island on a football scholarship before switching to golf. He turned professional in 1984.

Horgan was a member of the PGA Tour from 1989–94 and 1997–2000 and was a member of the Nationwide Tour in 1991, 1994–96 and 2003-05. He won three events on the Nationwide Tour and his best finish on the Nationwide Tour money list was 7th in 1996 when he recorded nine top-10 finishes. He also won the Rhode Island Open in 1994.

Horgan was involved in one of the more unusual disqualifications seen in the PGA Tour. He shot an opening round 71 in the 1998 Buick Open, but had forgotten to register for the tournament and was disqualified after the round.

Horgan qualified for the 2012 Champions Tour after finishing fifth at qualifying school.  In May 2017, Horgan qualified for the 2017 U.S. Senior Open by carding a 71 at the Legacy Golf Club in Port St. Lucie. He was one of only two players under par for the sectional qualifier.

Professional wins (10)

Nike Tour wins (3)

*Note: The 1996 Nike Alabama Classic was shortened to 54 holes due to rain.

Nike Tour playoff record (1–2)

Other wins (7)
1994 Rhode Island Open
1986 Bermuda Open
2003 Bermuda Open
2004 Bermuda Open
2004 Goslings Invitational
2006 Goslings Invitational
2014 Goslings Invitational

Results in major championships

CUT = missed the half-way cut
"T" = tied
Note: Horgan never played in the Masters Tournament or The Open Championship.

See also
1988 PGA Tour Qualifying School graduates
1989 PGA Tour Qualifying School graduates
1991 Ben Hogan Tour graduates
1996 Nike Tour graduates
1998 PGA Tour Qualifying School graduates
2012 PGA Tour Champions Qualifying School graduates

References

External links

American male golfers
PGA Tour golfers
PGA Tour Champions golfers
Korn Ferry Tour graduates
Golfers from Rhode Island
University of Rhode Island alumni
Sportspeople from Newport, Rhode Island
Sportspeople from West Palm Beach, Florida
1960 births
Living people